Jun Lee is a Korean American Taekwondo Grandmaster 9th dan and the founder of Black Belt World, a Taekwondo school of the Korean Martial Arts.  He has been referred to as one of the top ten martial artists in the United States. He holds the world record for breaking 5,000 one-inch thick boards in seven hours.  The Kukkiwon named Grandmaster Lee its spokesperson for International affairs on February 22, 2021.

Early life 
Jun Lee was born on November 17, 1962, in the village of Ansan, Gochang County in the North Jeolla Province located in the Southwest of the Republic of Korea. He was the third of six sons. His father, Inkyu Lee, was a civil servant and local politician. His mother, Yo Soon Lee, was a housewife. Jun Lee spent most of his childhood on a small farm.

In middle school, Jun Lee met Master Kang, who was his first Taekwondo master. Master Kang ran the Oh Do Kwan Dojang in Gochang. Jun Lee became one of Kang's top students, earning his black belt at the age of 13.
In the early 1970s with the Vietnam war winding down, many young Korean Taekwondo masters immigrated to the United States, including Jun Lee’s older brother, Hyeon Kon Lee. Hyeon Kon Lee opened one of the first Taekwondo dojangs in Virginia.

Immigration to America 
In 1982, Jun Lee was attending University of Seoul majoring in International Economics and emigrated to America to further his studies at George Mason University in Washington, DC. He graduated with a Bachelor’s degree in Science in Economics.

Taekwondo activities

First dojang 
Jun Lee and his brother Hyeon Lee believed that the Research Triangle area in North Carolina would be an ideal location to open a dojang. The Triangle was a growing area of educated middle to upper-class families, who would be keener on and better able to afford Taekwondo lessons. In February 1987, Jun Lee left Virginia and moved to Raleigh.

It was an opportune time in the US to be involved in the martial arts industry, which was experiencing phenomenal growth. The International Olympic Committee had named Taekwondo Sparring as a demonstration sport for the Seoul Olympics. Films like Karate Kid had caught the attention of young Americans.

Jun Lee arrived in Raleigh in the winter. Being new to the area and only knowing his brother, he lived in an Aerostar Van he owned.

Jun Lee rented a small commercial space in a strip mall that was in need of renovation. For a month, Jun Lee worked to renovate the space.

By early spring the renovations were complete, and Jun Lee’s dojang opened. The dojang was small, at just 2,700 square feet.

During the day, Jun Lee promoted his business by giving free martial arts demonstrations at gas stations, schools and county fairs. In the evenings, he taught Taekwondo classes. New students trickled in at first, but the pace quickly picked up. By the end of the year, Jun Lee had more students than capacity for his dojang.

With his success, Jun Lee opened several more dojangs in the Research Triangle area. As his older brother had done with him, Jun Lee placed his other brothers in charge of these locations.

Teaching philosophy 
Jun Lee realized that martial arts, specifically Taekwondo, were more than just kicking and punching. It was about a way of life. To Jun Lee, Taekwondo was and still is a way to better the person and society as a whole. Taekwondo extends far outside the dojang and into the community where masters and students can contribute to the betterment of all.

Inside the dojang, Jun Lee’s martial art vision took on a new focus. Jun Lee began to put his own stamp on the Korean martial art of Taekwondo. Jun Lee recognized early on that, due to cultural differences, some elements of Korean Taekwondo did not translate well into American culture. Americans strive to be individualistic and shun conformity, where Koreans strive to conform and shun individualism. Jun Lee had to adapt his teaching to his adopted culture. He had to develop new ideas on his own, while at the same time preserving traditional Taekwondo culture.

American culture allowed Jun Lee to add his teaching philosophy to Taekwondo, which would be unthinkable back in Seoul, not to mention his hometown. He changed the name of his dojangs to Black Belt World, to encompass his teaching philosophy based on the humanistic Korean concept of Hongik Ingan.  Jun Lee developed his martial arts philosophy on these principles:  1. to instill loyalty to one’s country, 2. to honor to one’s parents, 3. to respect for elders, 4. to care for juniors, 5.  to build positive relationships with teachers, 6. to treat all things with care,  7. to never seek advantage over the weak, 8. to use Taekwondo to benefit others, and 9. to finishing what you start.

Jun Lee believes that if all people practiced Taekwondo and introduced these qualities and values into their lives, not only would society be better off, but it would be much more liberated. As Jun Lee puts it, “there would not be a need for the laws that govern.”

Grandmaster’s test 
Master testing for fifth degree and higher dans had always been done behind closed doors.  Jun Lee decided to change  the tradition.  On November 23, 1997, Jun Lee tested for his seventh degree (7th dan) before an audience of his students and Taekwondo Grandmasters. This was the first World Taekwondo sanctioned seventh-degree black conducted in the United States. Grandmaster Jhoon Rhee, Grandmaster Woo Jin Chung, Grandmaster Dong Jin Kim, Grandmaster K.S. Lee, and Grandmaster Won Ik Yi were the examiners.

Jun Lee demonstrated his skills in the various Taekwondo disciplines, Poomsae (forms), sparring, board breaking, and demonstration.

The highlights of the test were Master Jun Lee’s breaking of a Louisville Slugger bat and his sword demonstration. With a baseball bat held in a special concrete stand, Jun Lee broke the bat with a single kick of his leg. While blindfolded, Master Lee sliced an apple perched on his student’s stomach with a traditional Korean sword.

Black Belt World 
Black Belt World is the name of Grandmaster Jun Lee’s Kukkiwon-certified self-improvement institution, located in North Carolina and Virginia, and outside the United States.

Politics 
In 2011, Jun Lee ran for mayor of Knightdale against the incumbent, Russell Killen.  Endorsed by the Democratic party, Jun Lee faced a steep challenge in trying to unseat a popular mayor in a town that saw organized parties “as glorified political mafias.”

His desire to run stemmed from his belief in giving back to the community. Education was the main plank of his mayoral platform.

The incumbent and Jun Lee politically sparred over the beautification and urban development of the city and educational reforms. Jun Lee lost a hard-fought race, getting forty-six percent of the vote.

Other activities       
Jun Lee has served as president of the International Coalition of Good Health and Good Friends (ICG), a Taekwondo global community service group. He is a former Secretary-General, the United States Taekwondo Committee and was appointed as guest professor for the Departments of Taekwondo at Woo Suk University. He holds an unofficial world record holder for breaking 5000 boards within 7 hours and has been selected as one of Top Ten Martial Arts Masters in the USA by Martial Arts World magazine.

Beginning in 2002, Grandmaster Jun Lee travelled to North Korea in the hopes that one day the two Koreas will be united, democratic, and free. But for now, Grandmaster Lee is building bridges through his generosity, Taekwondo, and his love of liberty.

References 

South Korean male taekwondo practitioners
1948 births
Living people
Martial arts school founders
People from Gochang County
Sportspeople from North Carolina